The Way of the Gun is a 2000 American Neo-Western heist action thriller film directed and written by Christopher McQuarrie in his directorial debut. It stars Ryan Phillippe and Benicio del Toro, with Juliette Lewis, Taye Diggs, Nicky Katt, Scott Wilson, and James Caan in supporting roles.

The film was released on September 8, 2000, and was a commercial disappointment, grossing $13 million against a production budget of $8.5 million. The critical reception was mixed, with some critics praising the acting, direction and action sequences, but criticizing the limits of the script, pacing and character development.

The film is now considered a cult film.

Plot
Parker and Longbaugh are a pair of low-level petty criminals who fund their existence through unconventional and often illegal means. Wanting to move past petty crime, they vow to get the proverbial "big score". While at a sperm donation clinic, the pair overhear a telephone conversation detailing a $1,000,000 payment to a surrogate mother for bearing the child of money launderer Hale Chidduck. Parker and Longbaugh resolve to kidnap the surrogate, Robin, but their attempt escalates into a shootout with her bodyguards, Jeffers and Obecks. The kidnappers are able to elude the bodyguards, who are arrested. Jeffers and Obecks are bailed out and returned to Chidduck by his right-hand man Joe Sarno. As Sarno begins coordinating Robin's rescue, Longbaugh contacts her gynecologist, Dr. Allen Painter, and orders him to a truck stop to examine Robin. 

After the examination, Painter returns to Chidduck, and it is revealed that the doctor is Chidduck's son. It is also revealed that Jeffers and Chidduck's wife are romantically involved. Longbaugh calls from a motel south of the Mexican border and demands a $15 million ransom. Jeffers and Obecks, tempted by the money, begin forming a plan to save the child and keep the money. As Longbaugh hangs up the telephone outside the motel, he is approached by Sarno, who identifies himself as the “bag-man” and offers to pay $1 million if they surrender Robin and simply walk away. Longbaugh, who is clearly skeptical of the offer from a “bag-man” declines the cash offer, but accepts Sarno's subsequent offer to buy him a cup of coffee. While having coffee the two discuss the current state of their chosen profession including the character of criminals and how no one takes “being a criminal” seriously anymore. 

Longbaugh jokingly mentions  “they want to be criminals more than they want to commit crimes”, to which Sarno agrees. After the two leave the coffee shop Sarno tells Longbaugh that he “seems like a good guy” and ought to get out of this business. To which Longbaugh replies “what would I do then?”, indicating he is a true criminal. Sarno again offers to pay them $1 million dollars cash to turn Robin over to which Longaugh replies that he wishes he could accept the money but because Sarno is a bag-man he knows it would be a double cross alluding to that fact he was also a bag-man in the past. The two shake hands and guardedly go their separate ways. Longbaugh returns to his room, where Parker and Robin are playing cards. Sarno then returns to Chidduck's home to plan the next step. Jeffers comes to realize that Robin is Sarno's daughter. 

Jeffers, Obecks, and Painter leave to meet with the kidnappers, while Sarno departs separately with the ransom. At the motel, Parker is having second thoughts. As he confers with Longbaugh outside the motel room, Robin takes the opportunity to seize a shotgun and barricade herself inside. As sirens are heard in the distance, Parker and Longbaugh hastily escape, and Robin emerges just as Mexican police arrive, followed by Jeffers, Obecks, and Painter. As Painter and the bodyguards try to persuade Robin to leave with them, the officers pull their guns and order everybody onto the ground. Parker and Longbaugh open fire from a nearby hilltop, and the shootout leaves the two officers dead and Obecks wounded. Jeffers shoves Painter and Robin into his car and drives off.

Parker and Longbaugh torture Obecks to learn Robin's location, while Jeffers confines Robin in a room in a Mexican brothel. Jeffers forces Painter to perform a Caesarean section to retrieve the baby, despite Robin's confession that the child is hers and Painter's and is not Chidduck's. Meanwhile, the heavily armed Parker and Longbaugh infiltrate the brothel. The ensuing gunfight, which leaves Parker wounded, turns into another standoff, until Painter shoots Jeffers. Outside, Sarno arrives with a group of men and the ransom, which they stack in the courtyard. Parker wants to kidnap Robin and Painter again, but Longbaugh, guilt-ridden after seeing her condition, responds: "She's had enough." Despite realizing that the money is bait, Parker and Longbaugh charge headlong into an ambush.

All of Sarno's men are killed in the ensuing firefight. However, Sarno manages to shoot and cripple the already wounded Parker and Longbaugh, and then calls for an ambulance. Painter emerges with Robin and the baby. Lying in a pool of blood, Parker and Longbaugh call out to Sarno, informing him that the baby is in fact Robin and Painter's, and thus Sarno's grandson. Parker wonders aloud if this fact will influence Sarno to let them keep the child. Robin and the baby are then taken away in the ambulance with Painter, Sarno and the money, leaving Parker and Longbaugh to die. Days later, Chidduck's wife reveals that she is pregnant.

Cast
 Ryan Phillippe as Parker
 Benicio del Toro as Longbaugh
 Juliette Lewis as Robin
 James Caan as Joe Sarno
 Taye Diggs as Jeffers
 Nicky Katt as Obecks
 Geoffrey Lewis as Abner Mercer
 Dylan Kussman as Dr. Allen Painter
 Scott Wilson as Hale Chidduck
 Kristin Lehman as Francesca Chidduck
 Mando Guerrero as Federale #1
 Sarah Silverman as Raving Bitch

Production
After winning an Academy Award for The Usual Suspects, Christopher McQuarrie assumed that he would have no problem making his next movie "and then you slowly start to realize no one in Hollywood is interested in making your film, they're interested in making their films." He spent years as a script doctor while trying to get financing for an epic biopic of Alexander the Great for Warner Bros. before finally realizing that he "had to make a film with some commercial success to be taken seriously." He approached 20th Century Fox and told them that he would be willing to write and direct a movie for any budget they would be willing to give him as long as he had complete creative control. "Fox told me to get fucked. No money. No control. No nothing. They didn't want my input, they just wanted me. For nothing."

Over coffee, Benicio del Toro asked McQuarrie why he had not made another crime film. McQuarrie replied that he did not want to be typecast as "a crime guy" but realized that he had nothing to lose, "unemployed and ready to make trouble". Del Toro convinced him to write a crime film on his own terms because he would get the least amount of interference from a studio. McQuarrie was interested in making a movie "that you can follow characters who don't go out of their way to ingratiate themselves to you, who aren't traditionally sympathetic."

McQuarrie started to write the script and "the first thing I did was to write a list of every taboo, everything I knew a cowardly executive would refuse to accept from a 'sympathetic' leading man." The first ten pages were a prologue, a trailer to another movie with Parker and Longbaugh (the real last names of Butch Cassidy and the Sundance Kid) and was "to be shot as slick and hip as possible, but with horrible, unspeakable acts of violence and degradation." During pre-production, McQuarrie realized that this was too extreme and cut it out. He and del Toro gave the script to several high-profile actors at the time all of whom turned them down. Ryan Phillippe wanted to change the direction of his career and "was besieged with choice offers, and we didn't want him, but he would not take no for an answer."

Reception

Box office
The film opened at #9 at the North American box office making $2,150,979 in its opening weekend.

Critical response
On Rotten Tomatoes the film has an approval rating of 45% based on 132 reviews, with an average rating of 5.50/10. The site's consensus read: "Christopher McQuarrie may exhibit a way behind the camera in the stylish The Way of the Gun, but his script falters with dull characterization and a plot so needlessly twisty that most viewers will be ready to tune out before the final reveal." On Metacritic, the film had a score of 49 out of 100, sampled from 30 critic reviews, indicating "mixed or average reviews". Audiences surveyed by CinemaScore gave the film a grade B− on scale of A to F.

In his review for The New York Times, Elvis Mitchell wrote, "It's a song you've heard before, but each chord is hit with extraordinary concentration." Andy Seiler praised James Caan's performance in his review for USA Today, "To hear Caan menacingly intone 'I can promise you a day of reckoning you will not live long enough to never forget' is to remember why this man is a star." In his review for the Village Voice, J. Hoberman wrote, "Phillippe talks like Brando; Del Toro apes the body language. Nevertheless, James Caan steals the movie as a veteran tough guy, rotating his torso around some unseen truss." Entertainment Weekly gave the film a "B" rating and Owen Gleiberman wrote, "The Way of the Gun plays like an unusually ritzy festival circuit audition film, though McQuarrie, it must be said, aces the audition."

Roger Ebert of the Chicago Sun-Times gave the film two-and-a-half stars out of four and wrote, "McQuarrie pulls, pummels and pushes us, makes his characters jump through hoops, and at the end produces carloads of 'bag men' who have no other function than to pop up and be shot at ... Enough, already." In his review for Time, Richard Corliss criticized McQuarrie for devising, "a two-hour gunfight interrupted by questions of paternity. But he's not so hot as a director, so what aims at being terrifying is just loud and goofy." Peter Stack, in his review for San Francisco Chronicle, wrote, "The Way of the Gun attempts to be poetical Peckinpah, but it's a pointless exercise in gun violence with characterizations so thin they vaporize."

About the movie's reception, Christopher McQuarrie said: "I'm very proud of the film. Is the film flawed, is it uneven? Certainly. But it's sincere."

References

External links

 
 

2000 films
2000 action thriller films
2000 crime thriller films
2000s crime action films
2000s heist films
American action thriller films
American crime thriller films
American heist films
American crime action films
American pregnancy films
2000s English-language films
Films directed by Christopher McQuarrie
Films with screenplays by Christopher McQuarrie
Artisan Entertainment films
Lionsgate films
Neo-Western films
Films shot in Salt Lake City
Films scored by Joe Kraemer
2000 directorial debut films
2000s American films